Cryptanthus delicatus is a plant species in the genus Cryptanthus. This species is endemic to Brazil. The plant can grow up to 6–12 in. (15-30 cm.), the plant can be found in light parts of Brazil as well.

Origins
The plant was found in Brazil by an unknown explorer.

References

delicatus
Flora of Brazil